Pianola is a small village near L'Aquila, Abruzzo in central Italy.

References

Frazioni of L'Aquila